A Meeting in the Royal Danish Academy of Sciences and Letters is a monumental 1897 oil-on-canvas group portrait painting by Peder Severin Krøyer, depicting the membership of Royal Danish Academy of Sciences and Letters during one of its meetings in the Prince's Mansion in Copenhagen. The painting was commissioned by the Carlsberg Foundation in conjunction with the construction of its new building on H. C. Andersens Boulevard.

History 
The idea for the painting was first presented by civil servant Andreas Peter Weis (1851–1935) to director of the Carlsberg Foundation Edvard Holm dated 3 August 1895. The idea was later presented to Krøyer in a letter from the Carlsberg Foundation dated 20 October 1895. Krøyer accepted the offer and the price was set at DKK 25,000–30,000.

The painting was handed over to the Carlsberg Foundation in December 1897. It was accessible for the members of the Royal Academy of Science and Letters from 2 to 6 March 1898 and was subsequently on public display as part of the traditional Charlottenborg Spring Exhibition. In January 1900, it was installed in the Academy's new premises in the Carlsberg Foundation Building.

In 1900, the painting was temporarily sent to Paris as part of Denmark's contribution to the Exposition Universelle. In 1929, it was on display at the Danish Art Fair in Forum. In 1944, during the Occupation of Denmark in World War II, it was taken down and stored in another location to protect it from possible Schalburgtage. It returned to the building immediately after the war. In 1948, it was moved to the Danish National Gallery to be photographed for the Royal Danish Academy of Sciences and Letters' anniversary publication. In connection with the 100-year anniversary of Krøyer's birth in 1951, it was moved to a new permanent location in the Academy's meeting room. Two marble pilasters were removed to make room for the painting. From 18 November to 4 December, in association with a memorial exhibition in the Charlottenborg Exhibition Building, it was possible for the public to see the painting in its new location. From May to September 2019, it was loaned out to Skagens Museum for the exhibition Mesterværker  Krøyer på bestilling.

People depicted 

 Johan Ludvig Heiberg
  (1846–1925)
 Haldor Topsøe
  (1844–1929)
 Viggo Fausböll
 Jørgen Pedersen Gram
 Harald Høffding
 Carl Julius Salomonsen (1847–1929)
 Christian Bohr
  (1850–1901)
 Christian Christiansen (physicist)
 
  (1848–1916)
 
 Johan Lange
 Hermann Möller
  (1833–1915)
 Frederik Vilhelm August Meinert
 Herman Valentiner
 Christian Frederik Lütken
 Karl Verner
 Kristian Erslev
 Crown Prince Frederick (later King Frederick VIII)
  (1849–1912)
 Hans Peter Jørgen Julius Thomsen
  (1820–1905)
 
 Sophus Mads Jørgensen (1837–1914)
 Eugenius Warming
 Ludvig Wimmer
 August Hermann Ferdinand Carl Goos (1835–1912)
 Johannes Nellemann (1831–1906)
 
 August Ferdinand Mehren
 
  (1835–1907)
 Vilhelm Thomsen
 
 
 Hieronymus Georg Zeuthen
 Adolf Ditlev Jørgensen
 Emil Christian Hansen
 Julius Petersen
 Johan Kjeldahl
  (1831–1917)
 Emil Rostrup
 Julius Lange
 Peter Kristian Prytz
 Japetus Steenstrup
 Johan Erik Vesti Boas
 Thorvald N. Thiele

References

Further reading 
 Lomholt, Asger: Et møde i Videnskabernes Selskab – P.S. Krøyers maleri og dets tilblivelse. Det Kongelige Danske Videnskabernes Selskab (1954)
 Tamm, Ditlev: P.S. Krøyer of de lærde: Et møde i Videnskabernes Selskab
 Koch, Carl Henrik: Videnskabshistorie som kunst. Article in Mesterværker, Krøyer på bestilling.

External links 

 Videnskabernes Selskab

1897 paintings
Cultural depictions of Danish men
Group portraits by Danish artists
Paintings by Peder Severin Krøyer
Paintings in Copenhagen